In the Royal Navy and other navies of Europe and the Commonwealth of Nations, ships are identified by pennant number (an internationalisation of pendant number, which it was called before 1948). Historically, naval ships flew a flag that identified a flotilla or type of vessel. For example, the Royal Navy used a red burgee for torpedo boats and a pennant with an H for torpedo boat destroyers. Adding a number to the type-identifying flag uniquely identified each ship.

In the current system, a letter prefix, called a flag superior, identifies the type of ship, and numerical suffix, called a flag inferior, uniquely identifies an individual ship. Not all pennant numbers have a flag superior.

Royal Navy systems
The Royal Navy first used pennants to distinguish its ships in 1661 with a proclamation that all of his majesty's ships must fly a union pennant. This distinction was further strengthened by a proclamation in 1674 which forbade merchant vessels from flying any pennants.

The system of numbering pennants was adopted prior to the First World War to distinguish between ships with the same or similar names, to reduce the size and improve the security of communications, and to assist recognition when ships of the same class are together. Traditionally, a pennant number was reported with a full stop "." between the flag superior or inferior and the number, although this practice has gradually been dropped, and inter-war photos after about 1924 tend not to have the full stop painted on the hull. The system was used throughout the navies of the British Empire so that a ship could be transferred from one navy to another without changing its pennant number.

Pennant numbers were originally allocated by individual naval stations and when a ship changed station it would be allocated a new number. The Admiralty took the situation in hand and first compiled a "Naval Pendant List" in 1910, with ships grouped under the distinguishing flag of their type. In addition, ships of the 2nd and 3rd (i.e. reserve) fleets had a second flag superior distinguishing from which naval depot they were manned; "C" for Chatham, "D" for Devonport, "N" for Nore and "P" for Portsmouth. Destroyers were initially allocated the flag superior "H", but as this covered only one hundred possible combinations from H00 to H99 the letters "G" and "D" were also allocated. When ships were sunk, their pendant numbers were reissued to new ships.

The flag superior for whole ship classes has often been changed while the numbers stayed the same. For example, in 1940, the Royal Navy swapped the letters "I" and "D" around (e.g. D18 became I18 and I18 became D18) and in 1948, "K", "L" and "U" all became "F"; where there was a conflict, a 2 was added to the front of the pendant number.

During the 1970s, the service stopped painting pennant numbers on submarines on the grounds that, with the arrival of nuclear boats, they spent too little time on the surface, although submarines do continue to be issued numbers.

 was initially allocated the pennant number F232, until it was realised that in the Royal Navy, form number 232 is the official report for ships that have run aground; sailors being superstitious, it was quickly changed to F229.

Second World War

No flag superior
Pendant number 13 was not allocated.
 Capital ships, aircraft carriers, cruisers

Flag superiors
Pendant numbers 13 were not allocated to flag superiors. The letters J and K were used with three number combinations due to the number of vessels.
 D — destroyers (until 1940), capital ships, aircraft carriers, cruisers (from 1940)
 F — destroyers (until 1940) and large auxiliary combatants (from 1940)
 G — destroyers (from 1940)
 H — destroyers
 I — capital ships, aircraft carriers, cruisers (until 1940), destroyers (from 1940)
 J — minesweepers
 K — corvettes, frigates
 L — escort destroyers, sloops (until 1941)
 M — minelayers
 N — minesweepers
 P — sloops (until 1939), boom defence vessels (until 1940)
 R — destroyers (from 1942), sloops
 T — river gunboats, netlayers
 U — sloops (from 1941)
 W — tugs and salvage vessels
 X — special service vessels
 Z — gate, mooring and boom defence vessels
 4 — auxiliary anti-aircraft vessels
 FY — fisheries (auxiliary fishing trawlers, drifter etc.)

Flag inferiors
Flag inferiors were applied to submarines. Royal Navy submarines of the "H" and "L", and some transferred American vessels, were not issued names, only numbers. In these cases, the pendant number was simply the hull number inverted (i.e. L24 was issued pendant "24L"). Pre-war photos show the pendants painted correctly, with the flag inferior, but wartime photos show that the numbers tend to be painted "backwards", in that the inferior was painted on as a superior. For obvious reasons, the inferior "U" was not used so as not to confuse friendly ships with German U-boats. For similar reasons "V" was not used. Pendant numbers 00–10, 13, and those ending in a zero were not allocated to flag inferiors.
 C ("coastal") —  (pre-war construction)
 F ("fleet") — 
 H — H class
 L — L class
 M ("minelayer") — 
 P — O class, P class
 31P— U class (wartime construction), V class
 211P to 299P — S class (wartime construction)
 311P to 399P— T class
 411P to 499P— A class
 511P to 599P— United States Navy lend-lease submarines
 611P to 699P— commandeered foreign construction
 711P to 799P— captured enemy submarines
 R — R class
 S — S-class submarines (pre-war construction)
 T — T-class submarines (pre-war construction)

Post-1948
After the Second World War, in 1948, the Royal Navy adopted a rationalised "pennant" number system where the flag superior indicated the basic type of ship as follows. "F" and "A" use two or three digits, "L" and "P" up to four. Again, pennant 13 is not used (for instance the helicopter carrier  was followed by ).
 A  — auxiliaries (vessels of the Royal Fleet Auxiliary, Royal Maritime Auxiliary Service, and Royal Navy Auxiliary Service, including depot ships, boom defence vessels, etc.)
 C  — cruisers (currently none in service, therefore unused)
 D  — destroyers
 F  — frigate (former escort destroyers, sloops and corvettes)
 H  — shore signal stations (military); survey vessels
 K  — miscellaneous vessels (e.g., the seabed operations vessel  or the helicopter support ship )
 L  — amphibious warfare ships
 M  — minesweepers
 N  — minelayers (currently none in service, therefore unused)
 P  — patrol boats
 R  — aircraft carriers
 S  — submarines
 Y  — yard vessels

Flotilla bands

1925–1939
From 1925, flotilla leaders were issued with but did not paint on pendant numbers. The Mediterranean Fleet wore black leader bands and the Atlantic – later Home Fleet wore white bands. The flotillas wore combinations of bands on their after funnel to identify them. From 1925 the following bands were worn;
 1st Destroyer Flotilla — one black band
 2nd Destroyer Flotilla — two black bands (one red from 1935)
 3rd Destroyer Flotilla — three black bands
 4th Destroyer Flotilla — no bands
 5th Destroyer Flotilla — one white band
 6th Destroyer Flotilla — two white bands
 8th Destroyer Flotilla (from 1935) — one black and one white band

Second World War
When single funnelled destroyers entered the fleet with the J class in 1939 and with an expansion in the number of flotillas, the system was changed accordingly. Leaders bands were white for Home Fleet, red for Mediterranean Fleet, and the system of flotilla bands changed to;
 1st Destroyer Flotilla (Mediterranean) — 1 red, G class
 2nd Destroyer Flotilla (Mediterranean) — 2 red, H class
 3rd Destroyer Flotilla (Mediterranean) — 3 red bands, then none, I class
 4th Destroyer Flotilla (Mediterranean) — none, Tribal class
 5th Destroyer Flotilla (Mediterranean) — none, K class
 6th Destroyer Flotilla (Home) — 1 white, Tribal class
 7th Destroyer Flotilla (Home) — 2 white, J class
 8th Destroyer Flotilla (Home) — 3 white, F class
 9th Destroyer Flotilla (Home) — 1 black & 2 white, V and W class
 10th Destroyer Flotilla (Home) — none, V & W class
 11th Destroyer Flotilla (Western Approaches) — 1 black over 2 red, V and W class
 12th Destroyer Flotilla (Rosyth) — 1 white over 1 red, E class
 13th Destroyer Flotilla (Gibraltar) — 1 white over 2 red, V and W class
 14th Destroyer Flotilla (Home) — 1 red over 1 black, V and W class
 15th Destroyer Flotilla (Rosyth) — 1 red over 2 black, V and W class
 16th Destroyer Flotilla (Portsmouth) — 1 red over 1 white, V and W class
 17th Destroyer Flotilla (Western Approaches) (from 1940) — 1 red over 2 white, Town class
 18th Destroyer Flotilla (Channel) — 1 white & 1 black, A class
 19th Destroyer Flotilla (Dover)— 1 white over 2 black, B class
 20th Destroyer Flotilla (Portsmouth) — 2 white over 1 black, C class
 21st Destroyer Flotilla (China Station) — 2 white over 1 red, D class

Flotilla bands were used throughout the war although war-losses, operational requirements, and new construction broke up the homogeneity of the destroyer flotillas. Vessels were deployed as and when they were needed or available, and were often incorporated into mixed "escort groups" containing a range of vessel types such as sloops, corvettes, frigates and escort carriers. A few of the escort groups adopted funnel bands; others (like the B7 escort group) wore letters on their funnels.

Post-war
Post-war Flotillas were no longer identified by bands, but by large cast metal numbers bolted to the funnels. Flotilla leaders continued to display a large band at the top of the funnel and half leaders would carry a thin black band around the funnel.

Deck codes
Aircraft carriers and vessels operating aircraft have a deck code painted on the flight deck to aid identification by aircraft attempting to land. This is in a position clearly visible on the approach path. The Royal Navy uses a single letter (typically the first letter of the ship's name) for aircraft carriers and large vessels operating aircraft, and pairs of letters (usually letters from the ship's name) for smaller vessels. The United States Navy, with its larger fleet, uses the numeric part of the hull classification number (a system analogous to pennant numbers). Deck codes used by contemporary major British naval warships include:
 HMS Albion — AN
  — BK
  — DT
 HMS Ocean — O
HMS Ark Royal — R
HMS Invincible — N
HMS Illustrious — L
  — Q
HMS Prince of Wales — P
 RFA Argus — AS
 RFA Lyme Bay — YB
RFA Cardigan Bay — CB
RFA Mounts Bay — MB

International pennant numbers
Several European NATO and Commonwealth navies agreed to introduce a pennant number system based on that of the Royal Navy. The system guarantees that, amongst those navies and other navies that later joined, all pennant numbers are unique. The United States  does not participate in this system; its ships are identified by unique hull classification symbols.

Participating countries, with their assigned number ranges, include:
 Argentina — (D: 1x, 2x; P: 3x, 4x; S: 2x, 3x; C: x; V: x)
 Australia (formerly incorporated into the Royal Navy system until 1969; now uses a system based on the RN pennant number format and U.S. hull classification symbols)
 Belgium — (A:9xx; F: 9xx; M: 9xx; P:9xx)
 Denmark — (N: 0xx; A/M/P: 5xx; F/S/Y: 3xx; L: 0xx)
 France — (R: 9x; C/D/S: 6xx; F: 7xx; M/P/A: 6xx, 7xx; L: 9xxx)
 Germany — (A: 5x, 51x, 14xx; D: 1xx; F: 2xx; L: 76x; M: 10xx, 26xx; P: 61xx; S: 1xx)
 Greece — (D/P: 0x, 2xx; A/F: 4xx; L/S/M: 1xx)
 Italy — (5xx; D 5xx; F 5xx; P 4xx; 5xxx; A 5xxx; L 9xxx; Y 5xx)
 Kenya
 Malaysia
 New Zealand (F111-HMNZS Te Mana)
 Netherlands (8xx; Y: 8xxx)
 Norway (F/S/M: 3xx; P: 9xx; L: 45xx)
 Poland
 Portugal (F/M: 4xx; S: 1xx; P: 11xx0)
 Spain (A: xx, F: 0x 1x 2x.., R: 01, 11, L: 0x, 1x.., P: 0x, 1x.., Y: xxx)
 Sri Lanka
 South Africa
 Turkey (D/S: 3xx; F: 2xx; N: 1xx; A/M: 5xx; P: 1xx, 3xx, L: 4xx; Y: 1xxx)
 United Kingdom (R: 0x; D: 0x & 1xx; F: 0x, 1xx, 2xx; S: 0x, 1xx; M: 0x, 1xx, 1xxx, 2xxx; P: 1xx, 2xx, 3xx; L: 0x, 1xx, 3xxx, 4xxx; A: any)

The NATO pennant number system added the Y (for yard) symbol for tugboats, floating cranes, docks and the like.

International Deck Codes

Royal Navy 

The Royal Navy uses a single letter (typically the first letter of the ship's name) for aircraft carriers and large vessels operating aircraft, and pairs of letters (usually, letters from the ship's name) for smaller vessel.

Albion class
 HMS Albion — AN
 HMS Bulwark — BK

 River class
 HMS Forth — FH
 HMS Medway — MY
 HMS Trent — TT
 HMS Tamar — TM
 HMS Spey — SP

 Daring class
 HMS Daring — DA
 HMS Dauntless — DT
 HMS Diamond — DM
 HMS Dragon — DN
 HMS Defender — DF
 HMS Duncan — DU

 Duke class 
 HMS Argyll — AY
 HMS Lancaster — LA
 HMS Iron Duke — IR
 HMS Montrose — MR
 HMS Westminster — WM
 HMS Northumberland — NL
 HMS Richmond — RM
 HMS Somerset — SM
 HMS Sutherland — SU
 HMS Kent — KT
 HMS Portland — PD
 HMS St Albans — SB

 Invincible class
 HMS Invincible — N
 HMS Illustrious — L
 HMS Ark Royal — R

 Queen Elizabeth class 
 HMS Queen Elizabeth — Q
 HMS Prince of Wales — P

 Bay class 
 RFA Cardigan Bay — CB
 RFA Lyme Bay — YB
 RFA Mounts Bay — MB

 Tide class 
 RFA Tidespring — TS
 RFA Tiderace — TR
 RFA Tidesurge — TU
 RFA Tideforce — TF

 Wave class
 RFA Wave Knight — WK
 RFA Wave Ruler — WR

 Fort Rosalie Class
 RFA Fort Rosalie — FR
 RFA Fort Austin — FA

Individual ships 
  RFA Argus — AS
 RFA Fort Victoria — FV

Royal Netherlands Navy 

 De Zeven Provinciën class
 HNLMS De Zeven Provinciën — ZP
 HNLMS Tromp — TR
 HNLMS De Ruyter — DR
 HNLMS Evertsen — EV

 Holland class
 HNLMS Holland — HL
 HNLMS Zeeland — ZL
 HNLMS Friesland — FR
 HNLMS Groningen — GR

Amphibious support ships
 HNLMS Rotterdam — RD
  HNLMS Johan de Witt — JW
  HNLMS Karel Doorman — KD

Royal Canadian Navy 

 Halifax class
 HMCS Halifax — HX
 HMCS Vancouver — VR
 HMCS Ville de Québec — VC
 HMCS Toronto — TO
 HMCS Regina — RA
 HMCS Calgary — CY
 HMCS Montréal — ML
 HMCS Fredericton — FN
 HMCS Winnipeg — WG
 HMCS Charlottetown — CN
 HMCS St. John's — SJ
 HMCS Ottawa — OA

Harry DeWolf-class
 HMCS Harry DeWolf — HF

Egyptian Navy 
 ENS Anwar El Sadat — AS
 ENS Gamal Abdel Nasser — GN
 ENS Tahya Misr — TM
 ENS El Fateg — FT

German Navy 
 Braunschweig class
 Braunschweig — BS
 Magdeburg — MD
 Erfurt — EF
 Oldenburg — OL
 Ludwigshafen am Rhein — LR

Sachsen-class frigate

 Sachsen — SN
 Hamburg — HA 
 Hessen — HE

Auxiliary ships

 Main — MA
 Mosel — MO

French Navy 
Charles de Gaulle aircraft carrier
 FS Charles de Gaulle - G

 Mistral class
 FS Tonnerre — TO
 FS Dixmude — DX
 FS Mistral — MI

 Horizon class
 FS Forbin — FB
 FS Chevalier Paul — PL

 Aquitaine class
 FS Aquitaine — QN
 FS Provence — PC 
 FS Languedoc — LD
 FS Auvergne — VG
 FS Bretagne — BT

 La Fayette class
 FS La Fayette — YE
 FS Surcouf — SF
 FS Courbet — CO
 FS Aconit — AT
 FS Guépratte — GT

Royal New Zealand Navy 
 HMNZS Otago — OTA
 HMNZS Canterbury — CAN

Portuguese Navy 
Vasco da Gama class
 NRP Vasco da Gama — VG
 NRP Corte Real — CR
 NRP Álvares Cabral — AC
Bartolomeu Dias class
 NRP Bartolomeu Dias — BD
 NRP Dom Francisco de Almeida — FA

Indonesian Navy 
The Indonesian Navy uses a three letter deck code only for frigates and LPDs. The letters usually consist of first letter, third letter, and fourth letter (or last letter) of the ship's name

Ahmad Yani Class
 KRI Ahmad Yani — AMY
 KRI Oswald Siahaan — OWA
 KRI Karel Satsuit Tubun-KST
 KRI Abdul Halim Perdanakusumah-AHP
 KRI Slamet Riyadi-SRI 
 KRI Yos Sudarso-YSO
Martadinata Class
 KRI Raden Eddy Martadinata — REM
 KRI I Gusti Ngurah Rai — GNR
Bung Tomo Class
KRI Bung Tomo-BTO
KRI John Lie-JLI
KRI Usman HARUN- USH
Fatahillah Class Corvette
KRI Fatahillah-FTI
KRI Malayahati-MLH
KRI Nala-NLA
Makassar- Class
 KRI Makassar -MKS
 KRI Banda Aceh — BAC
 KRI Surabaya - SBY
 KRI Banjarmasin-BJM
 KRI Semarang-SMR
Cakra Class
 KRI Cakra-CKA
 KRI Nanggala-NGA
Nagapasa Class
 KRI Nagapasa-NPS
 KRI Ardadedali-ARD
 KRI Alugoro-AGR

See also
 Ship prefix
 List of squadrons and flotillas of the Royal Navy

References

External links

 "British Navy Pennant Numbers" naval-history.net

Royal Navy
Ship identification numbers